Sugi is the common Japanese name for Cryptomeria (Japanese: , Sugi), a monotypic genus of conifer in the cypress family

It may also refer to:
 Japanese ship Sugi, Japanese Navy ships
 Hiroki Sugimura, a character in Battle Royale
 SUGi, American conservation organization

People 
 Sugi Sito (1926–2000), Mexican professional wrestler
 Ryōtarō Sugi (born 1944), Japanese singer
 Takuya Sugi (born 1983), Japanese professional wrestler
 Yoshida Shōin (1830–1859), Japanese politician

Japanese-language surnames